Yung Ho Chang is a Chinese-American architect and Professor of MIT Architecture. He was formerly the head of the Department of Architecture at MIT.

He studied at the Nanjing Institute of Technology (now Southeast University) before moving to the US. Then he received his M.Arch. from the University of California, Berkeley, and taught in the US for 15 years before returning to Beijing to establish China's first private architecture firm, Atelier FCJZ. He has exhibited internationally as an artist as well as architect and is widely published, including the monograph Yung Ho Chang/Atelier Feichang Jianzhu: A Chinese Practice. His interdisciplinary research focuses on the city, materiality and tradition. He often combines his research activities with design commissions.

Before MIT, he was the Kenzo Tange Chair Professor at Harvard Graduate School of Design and the Eliel Saarinen Chair Professor at University of Michigan.

Chang was a jury member of the Pritzker Prize from 2011 to 2017.

Publications
In 1997, he published Feichang Architecture, an album of his works.
In 2002, he published The Album for Feichang Jianzhu Atelier 1,2.

He has published many articles in journals including Architecture Today in France, The Art of the Moment in Italy, New Architecture and Space Design in Japan, Architecture in the U.S., Space in Korea and the World Architecture in Britain.

He facilitated a workshop session at the Holcim Forum 2007 for the Holcim Foundation with the title "Informal Urbanism".

Awards

Architectural Painting Award &Brown and Bakewell&Weihe in University of California, Berkeley
Professor of Architecture, Ball State University, College of Architecture and Planning, 1983 ~1989
The first prize of International Competition of the Design of Council House in Japan 1986
First Place, Shinkenchiku Residential Design Competition Japan Architect, Japan 1986
First Prize, From Table to Tablescape Design Competition, Formica Corporation, US 1988
Walter B. Sanders Fellowship, University of Michigan 1988 ~ 89
Winner, 3x3+9 Design Competition, AIA San Francisco Chapter & Architectural Foundation of San Francisco 1991
Steedman Traveling Fellowship, Washington University in St. Louis 1992
New York Alliance of Architecture, 1992 Award for young architects
Progressive Architecture Citation Award 1996
The 2000 UNESCO Prize for the Promotion of the Arts
China Architectural Arts Award (Pingod Shopping Street) 2003
WA Architectural Prize (Villa Shizilin) 2004
China Architectural Arts Award (Hebei Education Publishing House) 2004
Business Week/ Architectural Record China Award (Villa Shizilin) 2006

References

External links
Atelier FCJZ
MIT web page

Chinese architects
Southeast University alumni
Living people
Artists from Beijing
American architects of Chinese descent
American architects
Taubman College of Architecture and Urban Planning faculty
UC Berkeley College of Environmental Design alumni
Year of birth missing (living people)